Alva Romanus Baptiste is a Saint Lucian politician who represents the constituency of Laborie for the Saint Lucia Labour Party. Baptiste won the seat at the general election held on 11 December 2006. He also won convincingly in the 2011, 2016 and 2021 general elections. He is currently the Minister for External Affairs, International Trade, Civil Aviation and Diaspora Affairs.

References

Living people
Members of the House of Assembly of Saint Lucia
Year of birth missing (living people)
Saint Lucia Labour Party politicians
Foreign Ministers of Saint Lucia